The Yankton Indian Reservation is the homeland of the Yankton Sioux Tribe of the Dakota tribe.

The reservation occupies the easternmost 60 percent of Charles Mix County in southeastern South Dakota, United States and abuts the Missouri River along its southwest border. It has a land area of 665.712 sq mi (1,724.186 km²) and a total area (land and water) of 684.406 sq mi (1,772.604 km²), and a resident population of 6,500 persons as of the 2000 census. The population as of the 2010 census was 6,465 inhabitants. After the Osage Indian Reservation, it is the second-largest Indian reservation that is located entirely within one county.

The largest community on the reservation is the city of Wagner, which is the location of the tribal headquarters. The blues-rock group Indigenous is originally from this community, as is early 20th-century author and activist Zitkala-Sa.

Tribal information
 Reservation: Diminished Yankton Reservation; part of Charles Mix County
 Division: Dakota (Yankton) 
 Bands: Ihanktonwan
 Land Area: Approximately 438,100 acres total (425,900 land and 12,200 water)
 Tribal Headquarters: Wagner, SD
 Time Zone: Central
 Traditional Language: Nakota/Dakota
 Enrolled members living within diminished area: 6,500 in 2000; 6,465 in 2010
 Major Employers: Fort Randall Casino, Indian Health Service, tribal office, Bureau of Indian Affairs, Marty Indian School
 Website: https://www.yanktonsiouxtribe.net/

Government
 Charter: None; Constitution and Bylaws: Yes - non-IRA
 Date Approved: April 24, 1963
 Name of Governing Body: Yankton Sioux Tribal Business and Claims Committee
 Number of committee members: (5) five committee members
 Dates of Constitutional amendments: March 20, 1975
 Number of Executive Officers: (4) Chairman, Vice-Chairman, Secretary, Treasurer

Elections
 Primary election is in July and the General is every two years on the first Thursday in September. Executive officers are elected at large and serve two year terms in office.
 Number of Election districts or communities: 5

Meetings
 Regular business meeting are held once a week usually on Tuesday. An annual General Council Meeting is set for the third Tuesday in August each year.
 Quorum number: 5 members

Notable leaders, past and present

 Chief Struck By The Ree (1804–1888, Yankton) –As chief, Struck By The Ree managed to befriend the whites, yet remain dedicated and loyal to his people. He died in 1888 at Greenwood.
Chief Running Bull, Tatankaiyanka (1826–1900, Yankton) – He succeeded Chief Struck by the Ree. Running Bull signed the Treaty of 1858. He was the son of Zuyesa ("Warrior"), who had signed the Treaty of 1837, ceding tribal lands east of the Mississippi to the U.S.
Chief Smutty Bear, Mato Sabi Ceya (1790?–1865, Ihanktonwan) – his name was said to mean "He Paints Himself Dark Like A Bear". He signed four treaties with the US: the Treaty of 1825, the Fourth Treaty of Prairie du Chien of 1830, the Fort Laramie Treaty of 1851, and the Treaty of 1858. He was a strong defender and believer in tribal sovereignty. Spellings of his name varied: Maw-too-an-be-kin, Matto-sa-becha, Mak-toe-sah-bi-chis, and Ma-to-sa-be-che-a.

Education
Marty Indian School in Marty, affiliated with the Bureau of Indian Education (BIE), is on the reservation.

Communities
Dante
Lake Andes
Marty
Pickstown
Ravinia
Wagner

References

Yankton Reservation, South Dakota, United States Census Bureau

External links

American Indian reservations in South Dakota
Populated places in Charles Mix County, South Dakota
Yankton Dakota